"Vibe" is a song by American R&B group Zhané recorded for their debut album, Pronounced Jah-Nay (1994). It samples George Benson's 1980 single "Love X Love" and was released as the album's fourth single on August 8, 1994.

Critical reception
J.D. Considine from The Baltimore Sun viewed the song as a "sturdy, bass-thumping number". Pan-European magazine Music & Media wrote, "Hey Mr. DJ get into the vibe of the most attractive new jill swing duo, pronounced "Jah-Nay." Extra swing is added by a sample from George Benson's jazz guitar lick on "Love X Love"." PD Jon Kristiansen by Danish radio VLRNejle said, "It's music in today's vibe. If DJs are aware of it, it could become a major hit."

Track listings

 12-inch, vinyl
 "Vibe" (LP version) – 3:30
 "Vibe" (instrumental) – 3:27
 "Vibe" (a capella) – 3:33
 "Vibe" (LP version) – 3:31
 "Vibe" (instrumental) – 3:27
 "Vibe" (a capella) – 3:33

 CD, maxi-single
 "Vibe" (original album version) – 3:30
 "Vibe" (Maurice's Clubvibe mix) – 6:35
 "Vibe" (UBQ's Vibeunder mix) – 6:40
 "Vibe" (Georgie's Feelthevibe mix) – 5:42

 "Vibe" remixes (12-inch, vinyl)
 "Vibe" (Groove Theory mix) – 3:51
 "Vibe" (Reel Swinga mix) – 3:34
 "Vibe" (Maurice's club edit) – 3:52
 "Vibe" (LP version) – 3:30
 "Vibe" (Reel Swinga instrumental) – 3:30

 "Vibe" remixes (CD, maxi-single)
 "Vibe" (Sweets Illmatic mix w/o rap) – 4:12
 "Vibe" (Sweets Illmatic mix w/ rap) – 4:12
 "Vibe" (Sweets Illmatic instrumental) – 4:11
 "Vibe" (LP version) – 3:30

Personnel
 Executive production – Kay Gee, Steve McKeever, Zhané
 Music – Naughty by Nature, Renée Neufville, Rod Temperton
 Production – Naughty by Nature
 Writing – Renée Neufville

Charts

References

Zhané songs
1994 singles
1994 songs
Motown singles
Song recordings produced by Naughty by Nature
Songs written by KayGee
Songs written by Rod Temperton
Songs written by Treach
Songs written by Vin Rock